Ayam may refer to:

Ayam (cap), a Korean hat
 Ayam (people), Kuwaiti citizens of Persian origins.
Ayam, the Melayu and Malay word for chicken, used in names of dishes and chicken or food-related entities:
Ayam Brand, food company
Ayam bumbu rujak, Indonesia traditional grilled chicken
Ayam gulai, Indonesian curry dish
Ayam goreng, Indonesian fried chicken
Ayam goreng kalasan, Indonesia traditional fried chicken
Ayam pansuh, Indonesian chicken dish
 Ayam penyet, Indonesian traditional fried chicken
Opor Ayam, Indonesian coconut milk chicken dish
Soto ayam, a yellow spicy chicken soup with vermicelli

Al Ayam ("The Days"), referring to several newspapers`:
Al Ayam (Bahrain)
Al Ayam (Malaysian)
Al Ayam (Sudan)
Al-Ayyam (disambiguation)
 Amur Yakutsk Mainline - partially complete railway in Eastern Siberia.